The 1987–88 Auburn Tigers men's basketball team represented Auburn University in the 1987–88 college basketball season. The team's head coach was Sonny Smith, who was in his tenth season at Auburn. The team played their home games at Joel H. Eaves Memorial Coliseum in Auburn, Alabama. They finished the season 19–11, 11–7 in SEC play. They lost to Georgia in the quarterfinals of the SEC tournament. They received an at-large bid to the NCAA tournament where they defeated Bradley to advance to the Second Round where they lost to Oklahoma.

The Tigers' most notable freshman signee was 7'0" center Matt Geiger.  Geiger was pressed into service early as a starter when senior Jeff Moore went down with an early-season injury.

Junior forward Mike Jones, the Tigers' leading scorer and rebounder, was declared academically ineligible and left the team after seven games.  As a result, sophomore John Caylor became a starting forward along with senior Chris Morris.  Caylor paid an immediate dividend by hitting a game-winning 3-point shot with 10 seconds left to give the Tigers an early conference road victory over #1-ranked Kentucky.

Guards Gerald White and Frank Ford were lost to graduation, but seniors Terrence Howard and Johnny Lynn, sophomore Derrick Dennison, and juco transfer Keenan Carpenter were able to offset the loss.

Roster

Schedule and Results

|-
!colspan=12 style=| Regular season

|-
!colspan=12 style=| SEC Tournament

|-
!colspan=12 style=| NCAA Tournament

Rankings

References

Auburn Tigers men's basketball seasons
Auburn
Auburn
Auburn Tigers
Auburn Tigers